David O. Shaff (February 18, 1924 – September 14, 2011) was a state legislator of Iowa who proposed the rejected Shaff Plan in 1963. He was from Clinton, Iowa. After serving in the United States Air Force in World War II, he attended the University of Iowa, where he obtained both a Bachelor of Arts and a Juris Doctor. He served one term in the Iowa House of Representatives, from 1953 to 1955, before serving three terms in the Iowa Senate, from 1955 to 1967.

References

1924 births
2011 deaths
Politicians from Clinton, Iowa
Iowa lawyers
Republican Party members of the Iowa House of Representatives
Republican Party Iowa state senators
20th-century American lawyers